Marie-Soleil Blais (born 21 November 1988) is a Canadian professional racing cyclist, who most recently rode for UCI Women's Continental Team .

References

External links
 

1988 births
Living people
Canadian female cyclists
Place of birth missing (living people)